The Midwest Independent Conference (MIC) is a National Collegiate Athletic Association (NCAA) Division I, II and III women's gymnastics conference.  The MIC was established in 1991 for schools that sponsor women's gymnastics teams, but do not have women's gymnastics as a sponsored sport in their primary conferences. The NCAA championships in women's gymnastics is a non-divisional championship; meaning athletes or teams from any division can qualify.

Although the conference has five teams, they are from all three divisions, and it is not recognized by the NCAA.

Members

Former members

Conference champions
Sources: UIC Women's gymnastics archives , Google MIC website 

 The 2020 season was cut short due to the COVID-19 pandemic, and the conference championship (scheduled to take place at Illinois State) did not occur. The regular season title was determined by National Qualifying Score (NQS).

Conference awards

Athlete of the Year

Senior Athlete of the Year

Newcomer of the Year

Woman of the Year 

Nominees for Woman of the Year must have a minimum of a 3.25 GPA and have been a member of the gymnastics team for three years. The candidate must also write a personal statement of 250 words or fewer about how her experiences as a scholar, an athlete and a leader, on her campus and in the community, have influenced her life and empowered her to have a positive impact on the world.

Sylvia Keiter Memorial Award 

The Sylvia Keiter Memorial Award was established in 2019 in memory of the former Centenary gymnast, who was tragically killed while stopped to help a motorist in need. It recognizes the athlete who best exemplifies the characteristics of work ethic, dedication, encouragement, loyalty, selflessness, leading vocally and by example, and making a positive impact on everyone she meets.

Head Coach of the Year

Assistant Coach of the Year

See also

NCAA Women's Gymnastics Championships
Google MIC website

References

College gymnastics by conference in the United States
NCAA Division I conferences
College women's gymnastics in the United States
Women's sports organizations in the United States
1991 establishments in the United States